Ek Saudagar is a 1985 Hindi film which starred Rajinikanth and Sharat Saxena.

Plot
Kishore (Rajinikanth) is a dedicated union worker for several years. Since the employees are concerned about their working conditions and wages, he represents them diligently. He meets with the new manager of his organization, Shanti, and both fall in love. Both meet the approval of their respective families, and are married. For sometime both live in harmony. But soon dark clouds form over their heads, as Kishore must head a workers' strike, and Shanti opposes him.

Cast
 Rajinikanth as kishore
 Sharat Saxena as Madhu

References

External links
 

1985 films
1980s Hindi-language films